Ozan in Iran may refer to:
 Ozan, East Azerbaijan
 Ozan, Zanjan